Surxondaryo or Surkhandarya may refer to:
Surxondaryo (river), a river in Uzbekistan
Surxondaryo Region, an administrative region of Uzbekistan